Bibbiena is a town and comune in the province of Arezzo, Tuscany (Italy), the largest town in the valley of Casentino. There are approximately 11,833 inhabitants

Physical Geography 
The municipality of Bibbiena is located in the heart of the Casentino, the valley in which the first stretch of the Arno river flows which, after having crossed the Valdarno (Upper, Middle and Lower), flows into the Tyrrhenian Sea near Pisa. Bibbiena occupies the northern part of the province of Arezzo, is located at an altitude of 425m above sea level and is about 30 km from the provincial capital. Florence, the regional capital, is 60 km further west. It borders to the north with Emilia-Romagna (Province of Forlì-Cesena, municipality of Bagno di Romagna), to the west with Poppi, to the east with Chiusi della Verna, to the south with Castel Focognano, to the south-west with Ortignano Raggiolo.

History
Already mentioned in the works of Dante and Ariosto, Bibbiena offers a wealth of artistic and cultural attractions that are little known. From the Middle Ages to the Renaissance, from the 8th century to the present day, Bibbiena has a series of historical monuments, of which only a few are mentioned here

 Palazzo Mazzoleni
 Palazzo Niccolini seat of the city hall and of the Archaeological Museum of Casentino "Piero Albertoni"
 Palazzo Dovizi, built by Cardinal Bernardo Dovizi, who is usually known as "Bibbiena",  He was born in Bibbiena and served as secretary to Giovanni de' Medici (cardinal)(later Pope Leo X).

The religious buildings include: 
 The Church of San Lorenzo, famous for the glazed terracotta reliefs by the Della Robbia school
 The Pieve di Sant’Ippolito (Former Chapel of the Tarlati Castle)
 The Rococo Oratorio of San Francesco 
 The Sanctuary of Santa Maria del Sasso, one of the most important Renaissance buildings in the Casentino area.
The Sanctuary of Santa Maria del Sasso, a unique example of Renaissance art, is just one kilometer from the residential area of ​​Bibbiena. In the central part of the upper church you can see the "Madonna del Sasso" by Bicci di Lorenzo, built on a small rock, the top of an enormous boulder: the "Sasso", from which the monastery takes its name. The ancient Marian cult surrounding the boulder prompted the architect to integrate the base of the rock into a small, lower-lying church, which houses the "Madonna del Buio" (Madonna of Darkness), a wooden sculpture from the school of Donatello. A valuable painting of Lappoli can be seen in the third church. In the upper church, on the other hand, there are works by Fra Paolino del Signoraccio, Ligozzi and Ludovico Buti. Finally, in the choir, the large painting of the Assunta by Fra Paolino and Fra Bartolomeo can be seen.

Society 
Inhabitants surveyed

Ethnicities and foreign minorities 
According to ISTAT data as of 31 December 2010, the foreign resident population was 2,104 people. The nationalities most represented on the basis of their percentage of the total resident population were:

 Romania 1,249 9.81%
 India 194 1.52%
 Bangladesh 193 1.52%

Traditions and Folklore 
Every year, in Bibbiena, the historical carnival is celebrated, also known as "Carnevale della Mea" (Carnival of Mea), which traces its roots back to 1337 and is linked to the medieval popular legend of the Mea. On the last day of Carnival, Shrove Tuesday, the traditional propitiatory rite of the "beautiful apple" takes place, during which a juniper is burned by the oldest in the village in the center of the "piazzolina" (Piazza Roma) to reap the good wishes. for the year to come.

Culture
The town holds its yearly "Rievocazione della Mea" festival on the last Sunday of Carnival and Shrove Tuesday as well as a similar celebration in the summer with parades in historical costume and a show in the main square.

Theater 
The Dovizi Theater, established in the mid-19th century, is located in Bibbiena.

Events 
The "Sagra delle Sagre" takes place every year in Bibbiena. In the historic center of the town many of the Casentino valley festivals gather for a day in June (Cetica, Chiusi della Verna, Corezzo, Faltona, Partina, Pratovecchio Stia, Premilcuore, Rimbocchi, San Piero in Frassino, Subbiano).

Anthropogenic geography

Fractions 
In the territory of Bibbiena, with the exception of the municipal capital, there are twenty-one hamlets

Other localities in the area 
Other relevant localities within the municipal area are those of Casanova, Caselle, Contra, Molino di Gressa, Moscaio, Pianacci, Pollino, Santa Maria del Sasso, Tramoggiano.

Economy 
In the past, the production of Casentino cloth played an important role in the local economy.

Infrastructure and Transport 
The municipality is affected by the crossing of the Casentinese railway.

Administration 
Below is a table relating to the successive administrations in this municipality.

Sister cities 
  Boulazac, France, since 1989
 Ochsenfurt, since  2016

References

External links

 Official Website
 Archived Official Website (2005)

Cities and towns in Tuscany